The Joe Jeffrey Group was an American rhythm and blues band. Their best-known song was "My Pledge Of Love", which reached No. 14 hit on the Billboard Hot 100 in 1969.

The group was made up of Joe Jeffrey (born Joseph Stafford Jr., Cleveland, Ohio; vocals, guitar), Al Russ (bass), Charles Perry (percussion) and Ron Browning (drums).

Career
The biggest hit for Joe Jeffrey Group was "My Pledge Of Love", which charted on Billboard Hot 100 at No. 14 from 26 July to 2 August 1969, and entered Vancouver's CKLG chart May 23, 1969.

The group also recorded a version of "My Baby Loves Lovin'", which charted concurrently with the bigger hit by White Plains. Their version reached No. 115 on the Billboard Bubbling Under chart.

In the early to mid-1970s, Jeffrey played in the greater Cleveland area three or four nights a week, in a bar off Miles Road named "In The Woods". The dark road off Miles road was literally 'in the woods'.  A solo act, he played guitar and sang. His repertoire included "My Pledge of Love", "My Baby Loves Lovin'", old standards, Stevie Wonder, different R&B artists, and his version of "Impossible Dream".

Stafford died of cancer at his Cleveland home on September 4, 2016, at age 80.

Discography

Singles

Albums 

 My Pledge of Love (1974)

References

Notes

External links
 Lyrics for "My Pledge of Love"
 

American rhythm and blues musical groups
Wand Records artists